Bornyl acetate is a chemical compound. Its molecular formula is C12H20O2 and its molecular weight is 196.29 g/mol. It is the acetate ester of borneol. It is used as a food additive, flavouring agent, and odour agent.

It is a component of the essential oil from pine needles (from the family Pinaceae) and primarily responsible for its odor.

References

Acetate esters
Terpenes and terpenoids
Food additives